Dojlidy Gorne is one of the districts of the Polish city of Białystok. It was incorporated into the city limits in 2006. Formerly, it was a village of the same name. The etymology of the name comes from Lithuanian word – dailidė (carpenter).

Districts of Białystok